Gurudwara Shri Toot Sahib is gurdwara, a historical Sikh temple, situated in the Amritsar city of Punjab.

References

Amritsar
Gurdwaras in Punjab, India